Zoe Renee is an American actress. She has acted on the series The Quad and in the films Jinn, Master, Chang Can Dunk, and the upcoming film The Hunger Games: The Ballad of Songbirds and Snakes.

Life and career 
Renee was raised on a farm in Fayetteville, Georgia, a city south of Atlanta. She has one brother. Her father, Speech, was in the 90s rap group Arrested Development. Renee enjoyed singing, dancing, and acting throughout childhood. She named Keke Palmer and Raven-Symoné as two actresses she admired growing up.

Renee was cast in the BET series The Quad shortly after graduating high school in 2017; it ran for two seasons. She next starred in the independent drama film Jinn (2018) directed by Nijla Mu'min, on which she portrayed a Muslim teenager.

In 2022 she was cast as a lead in the film Master opposite Regina Hall. She played the love interest Kristy in the Disney+ film Chang Can Dunk. Renee is a cast member in the upcoming film The Hunger Games: The Ballad of Songbirds and Snakes.

References

External links 
 
 Official Instagram

Year of birth missing (living people)
Living people
African-American actresses
21st-century American actresses
Actresses from Georgia (U.S. state)
People from Fayetteville, Georgia